Agma is a name for the velar nasal speech sound and the letter ⟨⟩ that stands for it.  

AGMA may refer to:

 Alliance for Gray Market and Counterfeit Abatement, an anti-counterfeiting and gray market organization
 American Gear Manufacturers Association, a trade group for companies involved in gears, couplings and related power transmission components and equipment
 American Guild of Musical Artists, an entertainment labor union
 Association of Greater Manchester Authorities, the local government association for Greater Manchester, England